Oscar A. San Antonio Mendoza was a Puerto Rican politician affiliated with the Popular Democratic Party.  He served as a legislator in the Puerto Rico House of Representatives for the 16th District from 1985 till 1996.  Afterwards he served as the Sergeant-at-Arms of the House of Representatives of Puerto Rico from 2001 till 2004.

He died in 2011 after he was assaulted in Naples, Italy while on vacation. He was 66 years old.  In 2016 Act 75 was passed naming road PR-466 in Isabela, Puerto Rico as Road Oscar "Cano" San Antonio Mendoza.  He was a member of Phi Sigma Alpha fraternity.

References

Popular Democratic Party members of the House of Representatives of Puerto Rico
People from Isabela, Puerto Rico
1945 births
2011 deaths